Spin State may refer to:

 Spin quantum number, a quantum number
 Spin states (d electrons), the potentials for high-spin and low-spin configurations of d electrons in transition metal complexes.
Spin State, a 2003 novel by Chris Moriarty